The Noynoy–Binay campaign or NoyBi began when Senator Francis Escudero endorsed the candidates Benigno "Noynoy" Aquino III and Jejomar Binay as president and vice president respectively. This was done without the consent of the two candidates, especially since Escudero, Binay, and Aquino all come from different political parties. Aquino had Manuel "Mar" Roxas II as his running mate for vice president, while Binay was the vice presidential candidate of Joseph Estrada, who was aiming to be elected president for a second time. The campaign was nonetheless successful as Aquino and Binay were elected as president and vice president of the Philippines.

Various campaign headquarters
University of Makati
Parc House, EDSA
Samar Mansion, South Triangle, Quezon City

See also
2010 Philippine presidential election

Notes

External links

2010 Philippine presidential election
Benigno Aquino III
Election campaigns in the Philippines